is a comedic manga series by Yūji Nagai about a penguin named Beckham Kinoshita, who attends Kirikabu Elementary School and who likes to eat hamburgers and hot chips. It is published by Shogakukan and has been collated into 15 tankōbon volumes as of January 2013. It has been adapted into a televised anime series which airs on TV Tokyo and has also been adapted into a theatrical film.

References

External links

2006 manga
2008 anime television series debuts
2010 anime television series debuts
2011 anime television series debuts
2012 anime television series debuts
Shogakukan franchises
Shogakukan manga
Shōnen manga
Winners of the Shogakukan Manga Award for children's manga